Aurel Friedrich Wintner (8 April 1903 – 15 January 1958) was a mathematician noted for his research in mathematical analysis, number theory, differential equations and probability theory.  He was one of the founders of probabilistic number theory.  He received his Ph.D. from the University of Leipzig in 1928 under the guidance of Leon Lichtenstein. He taught at Johns Hopkins University.

He was a nephew of the astronomer Samuel Oppenheim, and the son-in-law of mathematician Otto Hölder.

Works
 Spektraltheorie der unendlichen Matrizen, 1929
 The Analytical Foundations of Celestial Mechanics, 1941 (reprinted in 2014 by Dover)
 Eratosthenian Averages, 1943 
 The Theory of Measure in Arithmetical Semi-Groups, 1944
 An Arithmetical Approach to Ordinary Fourier Series, 1945 
 The Fourier Transforms of Probability Distributions, 1947

References

External links
 
 
 Spektraltheorie Der Unendlichen Matrizen at the Internet Archive

1903 births
1958 deaths
20th-century Hungarian mathematicians
Mathematicians from Budapest
Leipzig University alumni
Johns Hopkins University faculty